John Mark Hammond (born November 29, 1963) is an American Republican politician from South Carolina. He has served as South Carolina Secretary of State since January 15, 2003.

Early life and career
Mark Hammond was born in Lancaster, South Carolina, and grew up in Spartanburg, South Carolina. Following graduation from Dorman High School in Spartanburg, he attended Newberry College, graduating with a B.A. in political science in 1986. Two years later, he earned an M.A. in education from Clemson University. He began his professional career as a juvenile probation officer for the South Carolina Department of Youth Services. From 1990 to 1996, he served as a criminal investigator for the Spartanburg County, South Carolina-based 7th Judicial Circuit Solicitor's Office. In 1996, he was elected as Clerk of Courts for Spartanburg County, and was the first Republican to serve in that post since Reconstruction. Hammond succeeded Democrat Ken Huckaby, who had served four terms since 1977.  He was elected to a second term as Clerk of Courts in 2000.

Secretary of State
In 2002, Hammond was elected as South Carolina's 41st Secretary of State, after defeating two other candidates in the Republican primary, and winning over 600,000 votes in the general election. He was sworn in on January 15, 2003. Governor Mark Sanford appointed Marc Kitchens to succeed Hammond in the office of Spartanburg County Clerk of Courts.

In addition to his duties as Secretary of State, he also serves as Co-Chairman of International Relations Committee on Business Services.

He was re-elected in 2006, winning 61% of the vote, which at the time was the largest margin of victory in a contested statewide election in South Carolina history.

In 2010, Hammond was re-elected defeating his opponent, Democrat Marjorie Johnson with 60.9% of the vote.

In 2014, Hammond ran for reelection against Democrat Ginny Deerin whose campaign received a Republican endorsement from former South Carolina First Lady Jenny Sanford. Deerin was also endorsed by the South Carolina Club for Growth, a conservative political organization that usually supports Republicans. She was the first ever Democrat running for statewide office to have been endorsed by the Club for Growth.  Both Jenny Sanford and former South Carolina Club for Growth President Chad Walldorf served on the Board of Directors of WINGS for Kids, the nonprofit organization founded by Deerin. Deerin had made deregulating nonprofits a central theme of her campaign, which contrasted with Hammond's tough record of charities enforcement.  Hammond won reelection with 59.5% of the vote.

in 2018, Hammond was re-elected to a fifth term as Secretary of State and for a sixth term in 2022.

Electoral history

References

1963 births
21st-century American politicians
Clemson University alumni
Living people
Newberry College alumni
People from Lancaster, South Carolina
Politicians from Spartanburg, South Carolina
Secretaries of State of South Carolina
South Carolina Republicans